July was an unincorporated community in Jackson and Roane counties, West Virginia.

References 

Ghost towns in West Virginia
Geography of Jackson County, West Virginia
Geography of Roane County, West Virginia